Březová is a market town in Opava District in the Moravian-Silesian Region of the Czech Republic. It has about 1,400 inhabitants.

Administrative parts
Villages of Gručovice, Jančí, Leskovec and Lesní Albrechtice are administrative parts of Březová.

History
The first written mention of Březová is from 1238. From the mid-14th century until the mid-17th century, it was a town. Since 2018 it has the status of a market town.

References

External links

Villages in Opava District